Magomed Vakhayevich Elmurzayev (born 16 June 1997) is a Russian football player who plays as a left back.

Club career
He made his debut in the Russian Professional Football League for FC Anzhi-2 Makhachkala on 19 July 2017 in a game against FC Chernomorets Novorossiysk.

He made his debut for the main squad of FC Anzhi Makhachkala on 20 September 2017 in a Russian Cup game against FC Luch-Energiya Vladivostok.

He made his Russian Premier League debut for Anzhi on 5 November 2017 in a game against FC Amkar Perm.

On 25 June 2019, he signed with FC SKA-Khabarovsk.

Career statistics

Club

References

External links
 Profile by Russian Professional Football League

1997 births
People from Khasavyurtovsky District
Living people
Russian footballers
FC Anzhi Makhachkala players
FC SKA-Khabarovsk players
Russian Premier League players
Association football defenders
Sportspeople from Dagestan